Ivan Leigh Head  (July 28, 1930 – November 1, 2004) was a Canadian lawyer, legal scholar, and civil servant. He was an influential foreign policy adviser of Prime Minister Pierre Trudeau.

Born in Calgary, Alberta, he received a Bachelor of Arts degree in 1951 and a Bachelor of Laws degree in 1952 from the University of Alberta. He was called to the Bar of Alberta in 1953 and was created a Queen's Counsel in 1974. He practiced law in Calgary from 1953 to 1959. He was then awarded Harvard University's Frank Knox Memorial Fellowship and received a Master of Laws degree from Harvard Law School in 1960.

From 1960 to 1963, he was a foreign service officer with the Department of External Affairs working in Ottawa, Ontario, and Kuala Lumpur, Malaysia. In 1963, he was appointed an associate professor of law at the University of Alberta. He was appointed a full professor in 1967. In 1967, he was an associate counsel to Pierre Trudeau, the minister of justice, for constitutional matters. In 1968, he was the legal assistant to Prime Minister Pierre Trudeau. In 1970, he was named special assistant with special responsibility for advice on foreign policy and conduct of foreign relations.

From 1978 to 1991, he was the president of the International Development Research Centre. In 1991, he was appointed a professor of law at the University of British Columbia and was the founding director of UBC's Liu Institute for Global Issues.

He co-authored with Pierre Trudeau the book The Canadian Way: Shaping Canada’s Foreign Policy 1968–1984 (McClelland & Stewart, 1995) and was the author of On a Hinge of History: The Mutual Vulnerability of South and North (University of Toronto Press).

In 1990, he was made an Officer of the Order of Canada.

He was married to Ann and had four children. He died of cancer in Vancouver in 2004.

Selected publications

References
 
 University of British Columbia profile
 Canadian Who's Who 1997 entry

1930 births
2004 deaths
20th-century Canadian civil servants
Canadian diplomats
Canadian legal scholars
Deaths from cancer in British Columbia
Harvard Law School alumni
International law scholars
Officers of the Order of Canada
People from Calgary
University of Alberta alumni
Academic staff of the University of Alberta
Academic staff of the University of British Columbia
Canadian King's Counsel